PTF may refer to:

Science
 Palomar Transient Factory, an astronomical survey program 
 Pedotransfer function, a concept used in soil science
 Phase transfer function, used for the optics of an imaging system

Computing
 Program temporary fix (PTF file format), an IBM locution to designate bug fixes
 PlayStation Portable, a file extension for the PlayStation Portable systems
 Pro Tools 7 up to Pro Tools 9 session (project) file

Other
 Pat Tillman Foundation, a scholarship and leadership nonprofit serving U.S. military veterans and military spouses
 Peter Tatchell Foundation, a British human rights organization
 Police Task Force, former name of the Police Tactical Unit of the Singapore Police Force 
 Präzisionsteilefertigung Steffen Pfüller, a producer of high-tech precision parts and assemblies